Andrew Shaun Penn (born 31 March 1967) is a former British racewalker. He competed in the men's 20 kilometres walk at the 1992 Summer Olympics.

References

External links
 

1967 births
Living people
Athletes (track and field) at the 1992 Summer Olympics
British male racewalkers
Olympic athletes of Great Britain
Place of birth missing (living people)